Natalie Jayne Roser (born 18 May 1990) is an Australian fashion model.

Early life 
Born in Newcastle, New South Wales on May 18, 1990, Roser started modelling from the age of 13. She spent time living and modelling in Los Angeles, She currently lives in Sydney.

Modelling career
Roser was Fox8's face of the year in 2014. She was finalist in the Miss Universe Australia, as well as a contestant on the first season of The Face Australia, where she was the first eliminated, finishing in twelfth place. She became the Maxim cover girl for October 2016.

References 

Australian female models
Living people
1990 births
People from Newcastle, New South Wales
University of Newcastle (Australia) alumni